Premier Christian Radio is a British Christian radio station, part of Premier (a Christian communications organisation), owned by the charity Premier Christian Media Trust.

Premier Christian Radio broadcasts Christian programming, including news, debate, teachings and Christian music across the United Kingdom.

History
Premier Christian Radio was founded in 1994, broadcasting exclusively on medium wave to a Greater London audience when it also began its telephone counselling service, Premier Lifeline.  It took the air at a launch party in Battersea Park, London on 10 June 1995.

A series of magazine titles then joined. The charity currently produces Premier Christianity, Premier Youth and Children's work, Premier Woman Alive.

In 2001, Premier Christian Radio received an official warning from the Radio Authority for broadcasting "items that were offensive to people of other, non-Christian beliefs". A "yellow card" warning was issued, recognising that Premier had acknowledged its errors and put in place significant new compliance measures to ensure such breaches would not be repeated.

In the months of April to July 2014 Premier Christian Radio reached its biggest-ever audience in its near twenty years history. RAJAR figures showed a weekly reach for the period of 240,700 people in London and the South East of England, and also showed that each listener tuned in for an average of 10.1 hours each week. This boost followed on from a rebranding exercise in the beginning of 2014, and a new website which included listen-again features and breaking news. As of March 2021, reach and listening had fallen back to 121,000 people and 3.5 hours per week.

Availability

Medium wave AM
It operates on four frequencies on medium wave across six transmitters:
 1332 (London)
 1305 (Stevenage, Bishops Stortford, Harlow and Hertford; Crawley, Guildford, Reigate and Woking)
 1413 (Maidenhead, Camberley, Staines, Harrow, Watford; and Chelmsford, Brentwood, Dartford, Maidstone & Sevenoaks)
 1566 (Guildford)
It also broadcast on the Digital One national DAB multiplex, nationally on Freeview (channel 725), via its website, and via its mobile app. In 2016 it moved its DAB transmission to the SDL national multiplex which is lower cost but has less complete national coverage.

Digital DAB, Freeview and internet
Premier Christian Radio was at first only available on medium wave in London. It later added broadcasts on the internet, Freeview channel 725 (UK and Ireland), Sky Digital (channel 0123, terminated 14 December 2012), Virgin Media (channel 968, terminated 6 May 2009) and London DAB -  a national DAB broadcast was added later. In 2006, the media group launched Premier.tv, one of the first Christian IPTV channels in the UK.

Its 2007 application for a national DAB licence, as part of the National Grid Wireless consortium, was refused; Premier Radio said "almost 72,000 Premier listeners stepped up and made their voices heard in supporting the bid". In August 2009, Premier achieved its target of meeting the £650,000 yearly fee to broadcast on the national Digital One DAB multiplex and launched on the multiplex on 21 September 2009.

Premier Gospel 
Premier Gospel was launched as a DAB spin-off station in 2010, taking the London DAB slot vacated by the parent service's move to D1. Premier Gospel launched the Premier Gospel Awards in 2016.

Premier Praise 
A second sister station, Premier Praise!, playing contemporary Christian pop and rock, launched on 27 March 2016 as part of the Sound Digital national DAB multiplex. It will be available on SDL alongside the core Premier service, which completes its migration over from Digital 1 to SDL in April.

Listenership

Premier Christian Radio's supporters come from many different Christian denominations, including those from the Anglican, Baptist, Catholic, Evangelical, Methodist and Pentecostal churches.

In 2004 The Times placed Premier Christian Radio at number one in a chart of the "most upmarket stations" based upon the percentage of its audience (81%) that is ABC1. In the quarter ending June 2010 the station was receivable by 10,983,000 people; 143,000 listened, for an average of 12 hours each, 0.80% of all listening hours.

As of September 2022, the station has a weekly audience of 71,000 listeners according to RAJAR.

Notable presenters

 Cindy Kent, former singer with the 1960s folk group The Settlers.  
 John Pantry, 1970s singer and music producer.  
 Muyiwa
 Pam Rhodes
Noël Tredinnick, Principal Conductor of the All Souls Orchestra.
Justin Brierley, Presents Premier Christian Radio's flagship apologetics and theology debate programme Unbelievable

References

External links
 
 

Radio stations in London
Radio stations in Kent
Radio stations in Essex
Radio stations in Sussex
Radio stations in Surrey
Radio stations in Hertfordshire
Christianity in London
Christian radio stations in the United Kingdom
Charities based in London